Worthing West is a constituency represented in the House of Commons of the UK Parliament since its 1997 creation by Sir Peter Bottomley, a Conservative, who is the Father of the House of Commons.

Boundaries

Worthing wards: Castle, Central, Durrington, Goring, Heene, Marine, Northbrook, Salvington, and Tarring.
Arun wards: East Preston, Ferring, Rustington West and Rustington East.

The constituency covers the central and western two-thirds portion of Worthing, plus the villages of Ferring, East Preston and Rustington in the district of Arun. The eastern parts of the town are in the East Worthing and Shoreham constituency.

History
The seat was created in 1997 as Worthing and Shoreham were re-divided.

Before 1945, this exact land was in the Horsham and Worthing seat.

The MP since 1997 is the Conservative Sir Peter Bottomley. He represented the Woolwich West and related Eltham in south-east London from 1975 to 1997.

In the timing of the 2019 results this seat gave the Conservatives a majority, being the 326th counted up.

Members of Parliament

Elections

Elections in the 2010s

Elections in the 2000s

Elections in the 1990s

See also
List of parliamentary constituencies in West Sussex

Notes

References

External links
Election result, 2015 (BBC)
Election result, 2010 (BBC)
Election result, 2005 (BBC)
Election results, 1997 - 2001 (BBC)
Election results, 1997 - 2001  (Election Demon)

Parliamentary constituencies in South East England
Constituencies of the Parliament of the United Kingdom established in 1997
Politics of West Sussex
Arun District
Politics of Worthing